Kat Candler (born November 11, 1974) is an American film writer, producer, and director. She wrote and directed the 2014 film Hellion, and has worked on television shows including 13 Reasons Why and Queen Sugar.

Life
Candler grew up in Jacksonville, Florida. After graduating from Florida State University, she began her filmmaking career in Austin, Texas.

Career 

Hellion, starring actors Aaron Paul and Juliette Lewis, screened at the Sundance Film Festival. Candler's work in television includes directing seven episodes of Ava DuVernay and Oprah Winfrey's Queen Sugar. Candler oversaw season two of Queen Sugar as the producing director and season three as its showrunner. Candler directed two episodes of the Netflix series 13 Reasons Why—season two, episode nine "The Missing Page" and season two, episode ten "Smile, Bitches." During season three, she continued with the show as the consulting producer. Candler directed season two, episode nine of Sorry for Your Loss, entitled "The Whale." Candler also directed two episodes of the Apple TV+ show Home Before Dark—season one, episode five  "88 Miles an Hour" and season one, episode six "The Green Bike" as well as season two, episode three of Dirty John. The episode—entitled "Marriage Encounter"—aired June 9, 2020 on the USA Network.

Candler is currently writing and developing a horror film for Fox Searchlight and a TV series set in the oil refinery world of southeast Texas for TNT. Most recently, she was listed as the director of the television pilot The Republic of Sarah for The CW, set to premiere some time in 2021. Candler is writing, executive producing and developing Lords of Dogtown for IMDb TV, a television series based on the 2005 film of the same name.

Awards

2014 Sundance Institute Women's Initiative Fellow
2014 San Francisco Film Society/Kenneth Rainin Foundation Grant, Untitled Black Metal Project
2014 deadCenter Film Festival, Grand Jury Prize, Hellion
2014 Sundance Film Festival Nomination Grand Jury Prize, Hellion
2014 SXSW Gamechanger Award Special Mention, Hellion
2014 Humanitas Prize Nomination, Hellion
2014 Dallas International Film Festival, Grand Jury Prize, Hellion
2013 Austin Film Grant, Hellion
2013 San Francisco Film Society/Kenneth Rainin Foundation Grant, Hellion
2013 Best Narrative Short, deadCenter Film Festival, Black Metal
2013 Grand Jury Prize, Dallas International Film Festival, Black Metal
2012 No Borders IFP Participant, Hellion
2012 Best Short Film, Cine Chicks Film Festival, Hellion
2012 Texas Filmmakers Production Fund Recipient, Black Metal
2012 Best Live Action Short, BAMKids, Love Bug
2012 Best Live Action Short, Children's Film Festival Seattle, Love Bug
2011 IFP Emerging Narrative Participant, Nikki is a Punk Rocker
2011 Best Short, Festival Internacional de Cine Para Ninos, Love Bug
2010 2nd Place Jury Prize, Chicago's Children's Film Festival, Love Bug
2010 Best Florida Short Film, Jacksonville Film Festival, Love Bug
2010 semi-finalist, Austin Film Festival, Never Date a Teen Idol
2010 Traverse City Comedy Arts Festival, Audience Award, Love Bug
2009 Austin Film Festival Audience Award, Love Bug
2009 Official Participant in the Tribeca All Access Program, The Spider in the Bathtub
2007 Austin Chronicle Cover Story
2007 Austin Breakout Filmmaker, Austin American Statesman

Filmography

The Republic of Sarah (Director 101), The CW
Home Before Dark (Director 105 & 106), Apple TV+
Dirty John (Director 203), USA
Sorry for Your Loss (Director 209), Facebook Watch
Queen Sugar Season Three (Director, 312 and 313)
Queen Sugar Season Three (Writer, 301, 309 and 313)
Queen Sugar Season Three (Showrunner), OWN Network
Queen Sugar Season Two (Director 201 and 207), OWN Network
Queen Sugar Season Two (Producing Director Season 2), OWN Network
13 Reasons Why (director, two episodes, season 2), Netflix
12 Monkeys (Director 306), SyFy
Queen Sugar (Director 108 and 109), Harpo Productions
Bad Moms, (2nd Unit Director), STX Entertainment
The Rusted, 20 minutes, (Writer, Director), Canon, Grey Agency
Hellion (2014) Feature film
 (2013) – director, writer, producer
 (2012) – writer
 (2012) – story by
 (2012) Short film – director, writer
 (2009) – director, writer
 (2006) – director, writer, producer
 (2005) – director, writer
 (2004) – director, writer
 (2002) – director, writer, editor
  (2000) - director, writer, producer, editor

References

External links

Candler Productions

Interviews
Interview with Austinist

American film editors
American women film editors
American film producers
American women film directors
Florida State University alumni
1974 births
Living people
American women screenwriters
Writers from Atlanta
American women television directors
American television directors
Film directors from Georgia (U.S. state)
Screenwriters from Georgia (U.S. state)
American women film producers
21st-century American women writers
21st-century American screenwriters